Hkamti, Khampti or Khamti may refer to:

 Khamti people, a sub-group of the Shan people
 Khamti language, a Tai language of Burma and India
 Hkamti District, a district in Sagaing Division of Burma
 Hkamti Township, a township in Hkamti District
Hkamti, Myanmar, a town in Hkamti Township
 Singaling Hkamti, one of the outlying Shan states
 Hkamti Long, one of the outlying Shan states

See also
 Hkamkawn, a town in the Kachin State of Burma
 Khamtai Siphandon, a former president of Laos

Language and nationality disambiguation pages